An HII galaxy is a very luminous dwarf starburst galaxy. Generally, HII galaxies have a low metallicity and high percentage of neutral hydrogen. There is generally believed to be a relationship between luminosity and disturbed morphology, suggesting that the starburst activity in the galaxy is caused by tidal interactions. The distribution of luminosities tends to cluster around two different extremes: those with a high luminosity and highly disturbed morphology, and those with a low luminosity and fairly regular and symmetric morphology. Those with high luminosities are labelled by some as type I HII galaxies and those with lower luminosities as type II HII galaxies. There is also a general correlation between metallicity and mass of the galaxies. The name of HII galaxies comes from their spectroscopic properties which are more or less indistinguishable from that of HII regions.

References

Starburst galaxies